In mathematics, especially operator theory, subnormal operators are bounded operators on a Hilbert space defined by weakening the requirements for normal operators.  Some examples of subnormal operators are isometries and Toeplitz operators with analytic symbols.

Definition
Let H be a Hilbert space. A bounded operator A on H is said to be subnormal if A has a normal extension. In other words, A is subnormal if there exists a Hilbert space K such that H can be embedded in K and there exists a normal operator N of the form

for some bounded operators

Normality, quasinormality, and subnormality

Normal operators 

Every normal operator is subnormal by definition, but the converse is not true in general. A simple class of examples can be obtained by weakening the properties of unitary operators. A unitary operator is an isometry with dense range. Consider now an isometry A whose range is not necessarily dense. A concrete example of such is the unilateral shift, which is not normal. But A is subnormal and this can be shown explicitly. Define an operator U on

by

Direct calculation shows that U is unitary, therefore a normal extension of A. The operator U is called the unitary dilation of the isometry A.

Quasinormal operators
An operator A is said to be quasinormal if A commutes with A*A. A normal operator is thus quasinormal; the converse is not true. A counter example is given, as above, by the unilateral shift. Therefore, the family of normal operators is a proper subset of both quasinormal and subnormal operators. A natural question is how are the quasinormal and subnormal operators related.

We will show that a quasinormal operator is necessarily subnormal but not vice versa. Thus the normal operators is a proper subfamily of quasinormal operators, which in turn are contained by the subnormal operators. To argue the claim that a quasinormal operator is subnormal, recall the following property of quasinormal operators:

Fact: A bounded operator A is quasinormal if and only if in its polar decomposition A = UP, the partial isometry U and positive operator P commute.

Given a quasinormal A, the idea is to construct dilations for U and P in a sufficiently nice way so everything commutes. Suppose for the moment that U is an isometry. Let V be the unitary dilation of U,

Define

The operator N = VQ is clearly an extension of A. We show it is a normal extension via direct calculation. Unitarity of V means

On the other hand,

Because UP = PU and P is self adjoint, we have U*P = PU* and DU*P = DU*P. Comparing entries then shows N is normal. This proves quasinormality implies subnormality.

For a counter example that shows the converse is not true, consider again the unilateral shift A. The operator B = A + s for some scalar s remains subnormal. But if B is quasinormal, a straightforward calculation shows that A*A = AA*, which is a contradiction.

Minimal normal extension

Non-uniqueness of normal extensions 

Given a subnormal operator A, its normal extension B is not unique. For example, let A be the unilateral shift, on l2(N). One normal extension is the bilateral shift B on l2(Z) defined by

where ˆ denotes the zero-th position. B can be expressed in terms of the operator matrix

Another normal extension is given by the unitary dilation B'  of A defined above:

whose action is described by

Minimality
Thus one is interested in the normal extension that is, in some sense, smallest. More precisely, a normal operator B acting on a Hilbert space K is said to be a minimal extension of a subnormal A if  K'  ⊂ K is a reducing subspace of B and H ⊂  K' , then K'  = K. (A subspace is a reducing subspace of B if it is invariant under both B and B*.)

One can show that if two operators B1 and B2 are minimal extensions on K1 and K2, respectively, then there exists a unitary operator

Also, the following intertwining relationship holds:

This can be shown constructively. Consider the set S consisting of vectors of the following form:

Let K'  ⊂ K1 be the subspace that is the closure of the linear span of S. By definition, K'  is invariant under B1* and contains H. The normality of B1 and the assumption that H is invariant under B1 imply K'  is invariant under B1. Therefore, K'  = K1. The Hilbert space K2 can be identified in exactly the same way. Now we define the operator U as follows:

Because

, the operator U is unitary. Direct computation also shows (the assumption that both B1 and B2 are extensions of A are needed here)

When B1 and B2 are not assumed to be minimal, the same calculation shows that above claim holds verbatim with U being a partial isometry.

References

Operator theory
Linear operators